The 37th Canadian Parliament was in session from January 29, 2001, until May 23, 2004.  The membership was set by the 2000 federal election on November 27, 2000, and it changed only somewhat due to resignations and by-elections until it was dissolved prior to the 2004 election.

It was controlled by a Liberal Party majority, led first by Prime Minister Jean Chrétien and the 26th Canadian Ministry, and then by Prime Minister Paul Martin and the 27th Canadian Ministry.  The Official Opposition was formed by first the Canadian Alliance, led by Stockwell Day and then by Stephen Harper, and then by its successor party, the Conservative Party, also led by Harper.

The Speaker was Peter Milliken.  See also list of Canadian electoral districts 1996-2003 for a list of the ridings in this parliament.

There were three sessions of the 37th Parliament:

Party standings

The party standings as of the election and as of dissolution were as follows:

In 2001, 13 MPs opposed to the leadership of Stockwell Day left the Canadian Alliance and formed the Democratic Representative Caucus. Chuck Strahl was chosen leader of the caucus, which subsequently entered into a coalition agreement with the Progressive Conservative Party of Canada. In 2002, after Day had lost the leadership of his party to Stephen Harper, all but one DRC MP rejoined the Canadian Alliance.

Bills
Important bills of the 37th parliament include:
Assisted Human Reproduction Act
Canadian federal budget, 2001
Canadian federal budget, 2003
Canadian federal budget, 2004
Bill C-250, declared attacks based on sexual orientation to be hate crimes.
Immigration and Refugee Protection Act
Youth Criminal Justice Act
Pledge to Africa Act
Anti-Terrorism Act

Members

By-elections

References

Succession

 
2001 establishments in Canada
2004 disestablishments in Canada
2001 in Canadian politics
2002 in Canadian politics
2003 in Canadian politics
2004 in Canadian politics
Jean Chrétien
Paul Martin